Pinus lambertiana (commonly known as the sugar pine or sugar cone pine) is the tallest and most massive pine tree, and has the longest cones of any conifer. The species name lambertiana was given by the Scottish botanist David Douglas, who named the tree in honour of the English botanist, Aylmer Bourke Lambert. It is native to coastal and inland mountain areas along the Pacific coast of North America, as far north as Oregon and as far south as Baja California in Mexico.

Description

Growth 

Like all members of the white pine group (Pinus subgenus Strobus), the leaves ("needles") grow in fascicles ("bundles") of five, with a deciduous sheath. Sugar pine never grows in pure stands, always in a mixed forest and is shade tolerant in youth.

Distribution 
The sugar pine occurs in the mountains of Oregon and California in the Western United States, and Baja California in northwestern Mexico; specifically the Cascade Range, Sierra Nevada, Coast Ranges, and Sierra San Pedro Martir.

Genome
The massive 31 gigabase mega-genome of sugar pine has been sequenced in 2016 by the large PineRefSeq consortium. This makes the genome one of the largest sequenced and assembled so far.

The transposable elements that make up the megagenome are linked to the evolutionary change of the sugar pine. The sugar pine contains extended regions of non-coding DNA, most of which is derived from transposable elements. The genome of the sugar pine represents one extreme in all plants, with a stable diploid genome that is expanded by the proliferation of transposable elements, in contrast to the frequent polyploidization events in angiosperms.

Embryonal growth 
In late stage of embryonal development, the sugar pine embryo changes from a smooth and narrow paraboloid to a less symmetric structure. This configuration is caused by a transverse orientation of division planes in the upper portion of the embryo axis. The root initial zone is established, and the epicotyl develops as an anlage flanked by regions of that define the cotyledonary buttresses. At this stage, the embryo is composed of the suspensor, root initials and root cap region, hypocotyl-shoot axis, and the epicotyl. The upper (distal) portion of the embryo, which gives rise to the cotyledons and the epicotyl, is considered to be the shoot apex.

Shoot apex 
The apex has the following four zones:
The apical initials produce all cells of the shoot apex through cell division. It is located at the top of the meristem and the cells are larger in size compared to other cells on the surface layer.
The central mother cell generates the rib meristem and the inner layers of the peripheral tissue zone through cell division. It presents a typical gymnosperm appearance and is characterized by cell expansion and unusual mitosis that occurs in the central region. The rate of mitosis increases on its outer edge. 
The peripheral tissue zone consists of two layers of cells that are characterized by dense cytoplasm and mitosis of high frequency.
Lastly, the rib meristem is a regular arrangement of vertical files of cells which mature into the pith of the axis.

Etymology
Naturalist John Muir considered sugar pine to be the "king of the conifers". The common name comes from the sweet resin, which Native Americans used as a sweetener. John Muir found it preferable to maple sugar. It is also known as the great sugar pine. The scientific name was assigned by David Douglas, who was the first to describe it in 1826, in honor of Aylmer Bourke Lambert.

Ecology

Wildlife 
The large size and high nutritional value of the sugar pine seeds are appealing to many species. Yellow pine chipmunks (Neotamias amoenus) and Steller's jays (Cyanocitta stelleri) gather and hoard sugar pine seeds. Chipmunks gather wind-dispersed seeds from the ground and store them in large amounts. Jays collect seeds by pecking the cones with their beaks and catching the seeds as they fall out. Although wind is a main dispersion factor of sugar pine seeds, animals tend to collect and store them before the wind can blow them far.

Black bears (Ursus americanus) rely on sugar pine seeds for their food source in the fall months within the Sierra Nevada. There is relationship between sugar pine seeds and oak acorns, as the bears will feed preferentially on those that are in a higher supply for that season. Both sugar pine and oak species are currently in decline, which can have a direct effect on black bear food sources within the Sierra Nevada.

Threats 
Sugar pine trees have been impacted by the invasive species of mountain pine beetles (Dendroctonus ponderosae) that are native to western North America. The beetles lay their eggs inside of the tree and inhibit the trees ability to defend itself against the invading species. The beetles also feed from the trees nutrients which slowly weakens the trees overall health, making the pines more susceptible to other threats like fires and fungal infections by white pine blister rust. Blister rust can weaken the tree and enable further infestation by mountain pine beetles due to the lack of defense from the sugar pine.
The sugar pine has been severely affected by the white pine blister rust (Cronartium ribicola), a fungus that was accidentally introduced from Europe in 1909. A high proportion of sugar pines have been killed by the blister rust, particularly in the northern part of the species' range that has experienced the rust for a longer period of time. The rust has also destroyed much of the Western white pine and whitebark pine throughout their ranges. The U.S. Forest Service has a program (see link below) for developing rust-resistant sugar pine and western white pine. Seedlings of these trees have been introduced into the wild. The Sugar Pine Foundation in the Lake Tahoe Basin has been successful in finding resistant sugar pine seed trees and has demonstrated that it is important for the public to assist the U.S. Forest Service in restoring this species. However, blister rust is much less common in California, and sugar, Western white and whitebark pines still survive in great numbers there.

The species is generally resistant to fire because of its thick bark and because it clears away competing species. However, its mortality has been directly linked to dryer conditions and higher temperatures. Sugar pine trees grow in western North America, a region already impacted by climate change. Higher temperatures within a sugar pine forest can lower resin levels within the tree which will cause less protection against pathogens. At the same time the warmer winters make the survival of the pests and pathogens more likely. The weakened or dying trees then provide fuel to the forest fires, which may become more frequent and more intense, if the climate change results in warmer temperatures in summer, particularly if coupled with drier conditions and stronger winds.

Protective efforts 
Sugar pine trees are in a slow decline because of the several threats it faces: white pine blister rust, mountain pine beetles and climate change. Efforts to restore sugar pines and other white pine trees that have been impacted by invasive species, climate change and fires have been undertaken by governmental and non-governmental entities. One of the latter is a non-for-profit organization called Sugar Pine Foundation created in 2004 to plant sugar pine seeds in the Sierra Nevada along the border of California and Nevada. They plant seedlings grown from seeds collected from blister rust resistant trees. In order to identify if the trees resistant to that pathogen, Sugar Pine Foundation tested over 500 sugar pine trees and have found 66 resistant trees. The foundation is building a sugar pine population that is resistant to white pine rust because the fungus is a major threat and will continue to kill sugar pine trees at a very high rate.

Uses

According to David Douglas, who was guided to the (exceptionally thick) tree specimen he was looking for by a Native American, some tribes ate the sweetish seeds. These were eaten raw and roasted, and also used to make flour or pulverized into a spread. Native Americans also ate the inner bark. The sweet sap or pitch was consumed, in small quantities due to its laxative properties, but could also be chewed as gum. Its flavor is thought largely to be derived from the pinitol it contains.

In the mid-19th century, the trees were used liberally as lumber during the California Gold Rush. In modern times they are used in much lower quantities, being spared for high-end products as with Western white pine.

The odorless wood is also preferred for packing fruit, as well as storing drugs and other goods. Its straight grain also makes it a useful organ pipe material.

Folklore
In the Achomawi creation myth, Annikadel, the creator, makes one of the 'First People' by intentionally dropping a sugar pine seed in a place where it can grow. One of the descendants in this ancestry is Sugarpine-Cone man, who has a handsome son named Ahsoballache.

After Ahsoballache marries the daughter of To'kis the Chipmunk-woman, his grandfather insists that the new couple have a child. To this end, the grandfather breaks open a scale from a sugar pine cone, and secretly instructs Ahsoballache to immerse the scale's contents in spring water, then hide them inside a covered basket. Ahsoballache performs the tasks that night; at the next dawn, he and his wife discover the infant Edechewe near their bed.

The Washo language has a word for sugar pine, and also a word for "sugar pine sugar", .

References

Further reading

External links

 U.C. Jepson Manual treatment for Pinus lambertiana
 US Forest Service – Dorena Genetic Resource Center – USFS rust resistance program
 The Sugar Pine Foundation – The Sugar Pine and Western White Pine Restoration Program
 
 
 Arboretum de Villardebelle: photo of a cone

lambertiana
Trees of the West Coast of the United States
Trees of the Southwestern United States
Trees of the Northwestern United States
Trees of Baja California
Flora of California
Flora of the Sierra Nevada (United States)
Natural history of the California Coast Ranges
Natural history of the Transverse Ranges
Edible nuts and seeds
Plants used in traditional Native American medicine
Least concern flora of the United States